Clermont-de-l'Oise is a railway station located in the town of Clermont in the Oise department in northern France. The station is situated on the Paris–Lille railway. The station is staffed on weekdays and is equipped with an automatic ticket dispenser. There are two free paved car parks, with 120 and 200 spaces respectively. Both are underequipped and undersized; renovating them would require charging for parking.

Transport connections
Connections are available to intercity buses, but little service to surrounding communes is planned and there are too few seats with respect to the number of passengers commuting to Paris.

History
The station opened in 1846 when the first Paris - Clermont and then Paris - Amiens rail connections were established. It was one of the first stations to be opened on the line. Clermont was formerly connected to Beauvais via La Rue-Saint-Pierre and Rochy-Condé and to Estrées-Saint-Denis.

Services

The station is served by regional trains to Paris, Creil and Amiens.

See also

 List of SNCF stations in Hauts-de-France

References

Railway stations in Oise
Railway stations in France opened in 1846